Olof Peter Walentin Sundström (born December 14, 1961) is a Swedish former professional ice hockey player, and is the twin brother of former National Hockey League player Patrik Sundström. He currently works as a European scout for the Chicago Blackhawks.

Career
Selected by the New York Rangers in the 1981 NHL Entry Draft, he played parts of three seasons for the Rangers. He sat out a year before signing with the Washington Capitals and played with them for two seasons.

Sundström was traded to the New Jersey Devils prior to the start of the 1989–90 NHL season, and played with his brother Patrik on the Devils that season. He played hockey in Sweden during the next five years before he retired in 1995.

Career statistics

Regular season and playoffs

International

External links

Profile at hockeydraftcentral.com

1961 births
Chicago Blackhawks scouts
IF Björklöven players
Living people
Malmö Redhawks players
New Haven Nighthawks players
New Jersey Devils players
New York Rangers draft picks
New York Rangers players
People from Skellefteå Municipality
Swedish expatriate ice hockey players in the United States
Swedish ice hockey left wingers
Swedish twins
Twin sportspeople
Utica Devils players
Washington Capitals players
Sportspeople from Västerbotten County